Joel Aldrich Matteson (August 8, 1808 – January 31, 1873) was the tenth Governor of Illinois, serving from 1853 to 1857.

In 1855, he became the first governor to reside in the Illinois Executive Mansion. In January 1855, during the joint legislative session of the Illinois House and Senate convened to choose a US senator, he became a surprise candidate.  On the 9th ballot, he received 47 votes, 3 short of the 50 needed to win.  Abraham Lincoln, who was also a contestant, then asked his supporters to vote for Lyman Trumbull, who won on the 10th ballot.

After his term as governor ended he was for many years the president of the Chicago and Alton Railroad.

The last years of his life were marred by charges of corruption in the Canal Scrip Fraud case. The village of Matteson, Illinois is named in his honor. Matteson was buried in Joliet, Illinois.

References

External links
Illinois 2005-2006 Blue Book
Genweb

1808 births
1873 deaths
Politicians from Watertown, New York
Democratic Party governors of Illinois
19th-century American politicians